Gareth Echardt (born 16 April 1981 in Cape Town) is a South African former competitive figure skater. He is a six-time South African national silver medalist (2001, 2003, 2005–2007) and competed in the final segment at four Four Continents Championships; his highest placement, 14th, came in 2005.

Programs

Competitive highlights

References

External links
 

South African male single skaters
1981 births
Living people
Sportspeople from Cape Town